ABC Katherine is an ABC Local Radio station based in and broadcasting to Katherine and Pine Creek in the Northern Territory.  It broadcasts on 106.1 MHz on the FM band. The station's local staff consists of a single reporter, and its only local program is The Katherine Rural Report. At all other times the station is a relay of 105.7 ABC Darwin.

References

See also
 List of radio stations in Australia

Katherine
Radio stations in the Northern Territory